Faroa is a genus of flowering plants in the gentian family (Gentianaceae), native to  tropical Africa. Faroa species are noted for their ability to grow in harsh conditions such as on bare rock, sand, mineralized soils, and mine tailings with high concentrations of copper.

Species
Species currently accepted by The Plant List are as follows: 
Faroa acaulis R.E.Fr.
Faroa acuminata P.Taylor
Faroa affinis De Wild.
Faroa alata P.Taylor
Faroa amara Gilg ex Baker
Faroa axillaris Baker
Faroa chalcophila P.Taylor
Faroa corniculata P.Taylor
Faroa duvigneaudii Lambinon
Faroa fanshawei P.Taylor
Faroa graveolens Baker
Faroa hutchinsonii P.Taylor
Faroa involucrata (Klotzsch) Knobl.
Faroa malaissei Bamps
Faroa minutiflora P.Taylor
Faroa pusilla Baker
Faroa richardsiae P.Taylor
Faroa salutaris Welw.
Faroa schaijesiorum Bamps

References

Gentianaceae
Gentianaceae genera